Bangkok Assassins or Bangkok Kung Fu is a 2011 Thai action movie starring Mario Maurer and Arak Amornsupasiri. This movie was released on September 1, 2011 and distributed by Grindstone Entertainment Group and Lionsgate Home Entertainment in United States.

Cast
Mario Maurer as Naa
Arak Amornsupasiri as Phong
Vitsawa Thaiyanon as Kaa
Artikitt Prinkprom as Chi
Jarinya Sirimongkolsakul as Kor-ya

External links

References

2011 action films
2011 films
Thai action films